July 18 - Eastern Orthodox Church calendar - July 20

All fixed commemorations below are celebrated on August 1 by Old Calendar.

For July 19th, Orthodox Churches on the Old Calendar commemorate the Saints listed on July 6.

Saints
 Venerable Abba Diocles of the Thebaid (4th century)
 Venerable Macrina the Younger, sister of Saints Basil the Great and Gregory of Nyssa (380)
 Venerable Dius of Antioch, Abbot, Wonderworker (c. 430)
 The Venerable 4 (or 40) fellow ascetics.
 Saint Gregory of Panedus, Bishop of Panedus, New Confessor for the holy icons’ sake.
 Venerable Theodore the Sabbaite, Archbishop of Edessa in Mesopotamia (848)  (see also: July 9)
 Venerable Michael, ascetic at the Holy Lavra of Saint Sabbas and the nephew of Venerable Theodore the Sabbaite the Bishop of Edessa.

Pre-Schism Western saints
 Saint Martin of Trier, tenth Bishop of Trier in Germany and possibly a martyr (c. 210)
 Saints Justa and Rufina of Seville, two sisters, potters by trade, martyred under Diocletian and venerated as the main patron-saints of Seville (287)
 Saint Arsenius the Great of Scetis, an anchorite in Egypt and one of the most highly regarded Desert Fathers (c. 449)  (see also: May 8)  
 Saint Felix of Verona (Felicinus, Felice), Bishop of Verona in Italy, venerated from ancient times as a saint.
 Saint Symmachus, Pope of Rome (514)
 Saint Ambrose Autpertus, a Frankish Benedictine abbot (c. 778)
 Saint Jerome of Pavia, Bishop of Pavia in Italy (787)
 Saint Aurea of Córdoba (Aura), a nun at Santa María de Cuteclara de Córdoba, martyred by beheading (856)

Post-Schism Orthodox saints
 Blessed Romanus of Ryazan, Prince of Ryazan (1270)
 Venerable Paisius of Kiev Far Caves (14th century)
 Blessed King Stefan Lazarević of Serbia (1427), and his mother St. Milica of Serbia (Eugenia in schema) (1405)
 Saint Sophronius (Smirnov), Archimandrite, of Svyatogorsk Monastery (1921)

Other commemorations
 Icon of the Most Holy Theotokos "Umileniye" ("of Tender Feeling") of Diveyevo Convent (1885)  (see also: July 28)
 Uncovering of the relics (1903) of Venerable Seraphim of Sarov, Wonderworker (1833)
 Commemoration of the miracle  (1944) of Hieromartyr Charalampus (202), who saved the residents of Erana-Filiatra in Messinia from certain death.
 Synaxis of the Saints of Kursk.
 Repose of Hiero-Schemamonk Anthony of Valaam (1862)
 Repose of Blessed Abbot Nilus, of St. Nilus of Sora Monastery (1870)
 Repose of Elder John, of St. Nilus of Sora Monastery (1903)
 Repose of Archimandrite Nektary (Chernobyl) of Jerusalem (2000)

Icon gallery

Notes

References

Sources
 July 19/August 1. Orthodox Calendar (PRAVOSLAVIE.RU).
 August 1 / July 19. HOLY TRINITY RUSSIAN ORTHODOX CHURCH (A parish of the Patriarchate of Moscow).
 July 19. OCA - The Lives of the Saints.
 July 19. The Year of Our Salvation - Holy Transfiguration Monastery, Brookline, Massachusetts. 
 The Autonomous Orthodox Metropolia of Western Europe and the Americas (ROCOR). St. Hilarion Calendar of Saints for the year of our Lord 2004. St. Hilarion Press (Austin, TX). p. 53.
 The Nineteenth Day of the Month of July. Orthodoxy in China.
 July 19. Latin Saints of the Orthodox Patriarchate of Rome.
 The Roman Martyrology. Transl. by the Archbishop of Baltimore. Last Edition, According to the Copy Printed at Rome in 1914. Revised Edition, with the Imprimatur of His Eminence Cardinal Gibbons. Baltimore: John Murphy Company, 1916. pp. 213–214.
 Rev. Richard Stanton. A Menology of England and Wales, or, Brief Memorials of the Ancient British and English Saints Arranged According to the Calendar, Together with the Martyrs of the 16th and 17th Centuries. London: Burns & Oates, 1892. pp. 347–348.

 Greek Sources
 Great Synaxaristes:  19 ΙΟΥΛΙΟΥ. ΜΕΓΑΣ ΣΥΝΑΞΑΡΙΣΤΗΣ.
  Συναξαριστής. 19 Ιουλίου. ECCLESIA.GR. (H ΕΚΚΛΗΣΙΑ ΤΗΣ ΕΛΛΑΔΟΣ). 
  19/07/. Ορθόδοξος Συναξαριστής.

 Russian Sources
  1 августа (19 июля). Православная Энциклопедия под редакцией Патриарха Московского и всея Руси Кирилла (электронная версия). (Orthodox Encyclopedia - Pravenc.ru).
  19 июля по старому стилю / 1 августа по новому стилю. СПЖ "Союз православных журналистов". .
  19 июля (ст.ст.) 1 августа  (нов. ст.). Русская Православная Церковь Отдел внешних церковных связей. (DECR).

July in the Eastern Orthodox calendar